Harvey Milk Institute, located in San Francisco, California, was the largest queer studies institute in the world, and was founded by Jonathan David Katz in 1995.  It was named in honor of Harvey Milk, an American politician and gay rights activist.

The Institute strived to create an educational home for the San Francisco Bay Area's gay and lesbian, bisexual and transgender communities, who felt that their needs and interests were ignored or marginalised by schools of higher education. Courses offered by the Institute included Queering Culture, Prostitution 101, Lesbian and Gay Parenting and Queer Consciousness.

See also 
 National Queer Arts Festival
 Hetrick-Martin Institute

References 

LGBT organizations in the United States
1995 establishments in California